Kelly Evernden and Todd Witsken were the defending champions but they competed with different partners that year, Evernden with Nicolás Pereira and Witsken with Jorge Lozano.

Evernden and Pereira lost in the second round to Peter Doohan and Laurie Warder, as did Lozano and Witsken to Steve DeVries and David Macpherson.

Paul Annacone and David Wheaton won in the final 6–1, 7–6 against Broderick Dyke and Peter Lundgren.

Seeds
Champion seeds are indicated in bold text while text in italics indicates the round in which those seeds were eliminated. The top four seeded teams received byes into the second round.

Draw

Finals

Top half

Bottom half

External links
 1990 Canadian Open Men's Doubles draw

Canadian Open
1990 in Canadian tennis